The Journal asiatique (full earlier title Journal Asiatique ou Recueil de Mémoires, d'Extraits et de Notices relatifs à l'Histoire, à la Philosophie, aux Langues et à la Littérature des Peuples Orientaux) is a biannual peer-reviewed academic journal established in 1822 by the Société Asiatique covering Asian studies. It publishes articles  in French and several other European languages. Cited texts are presented in their original languages. Each issue also includes news of the Société Asiatique and its members, obituaries of notable Orientalists, critical reviews, and books received. The journal is published by  Peeters Publishers on behalf of the Société Asiatique and the editor-in-chief is Jean-Marie Durand.

It is one of the oldest continuous French publications.

Abstracting and indexing 
The journal is abstracted and indexed in: Bibliographie linguistique/Linguistic Bibliography, ATLA Religion Database, Index to the Study of Religions Online, Index Islamicus, and Scopus.

Previous editors 
The following people have been editor-in-chief:

External links

Archive page consecrated to Journal asiatique on site of Peeters (Belgium)
Journal asiatique issues from 1822 to 1940 in Gallica 
Journal asiatique on French Wikisource (1822–1923)

Publications established in 1822
Asian studies journals
Biannual journals
Multilingual journals
Peeters Publishers academic journals
Academic journals associated with learned and professional societies
1822 establishments in France